The awards were presented by Chief minister of Kerala Oommen Chandy on 26 December 2015, with the presence of the chief guest Mohanlal.

Jury
The 10-member jury, headed by John Paul, was composed of people representing different areas of cinema: Directors : Bhadran (director), Suresh Unnithan and Balu Kiriyath, sound recordist Renjith, cameraman Sunny Joseph, Rajamani, G. Murali, S. Rajendran Nair, and producer M. M. Hamsa. The jury for writings on cinema was chaired by Satheesh Babu Payyannur. Raja Narayanan and A Padmanabhan were the other members of the panel.

Winners 

Most Awards

See also 
61st National Film Awards

References

External links 
 http://www.keralafilm.com

Kerala State Film Awards
2014 Indian film awards